Revolutionary History was a British journal covering the history of the far left. It was established in 1988 by Sam Bornstein and Al Richardson and maintained an editorial board representing many strands of British Trotskyism. In its articles it also covered other anti-Stalinist communist traditions. Most issues were themed and consisted of documents that had either never appeared in English or had been out of print for many years, together with contextual and introductory materials. Some issues consisted of original studies of episodes of revolutionary struggle or studies of specific individuals or organisations. The journal appeared approximately once a year and was published through the Merlin Press. Its last issue appeared in 2009.

References

External links
Back issues of Revolutionary History journal

History journals
Trotskyism
Publications established in 1988
English-language journals
Marxist journals